Edwin Albert Robson (April 16, 1905 – October 21, 1986) was a United States district judge of the United States District Court for the Northern District of Illinois.

Education and career

Born in Chicago, Illinois, Robson received a Bachelor of Laws from the DePaul University College of Law in 1928 and entered private practice in Chicago. He became a Judge of the Superior Court of Cook County in 1945. In 1949 he became Chief Justice of that court. He became a Judge of the Illinois Appellate Court in 1951, a role he served in until his appointment to the federal bench.

Federal judicial service

Robson received a recess appointment from President Dwight D. Eisenhower on September 29, 1958, to a seat vacated by Judge Winfred George Knoch on the United States District Court for the Northern District of Illinois. He was formally nominated to the same seat by President Eisenhower on January 17, 1959, confirmed on April 29, 1959, and received his commission on April 30, 1959. He was a member of the Judicial Conference of the United States from 1966 to 1969, and a member of the Judicial Panel on Multidistrict Litigation from 1968 to 1979. He served as Chief Judge from 1970 to 1975, and assumed senior status on April 16, 1975. Robson served in that capacity until his death on October 21, 1986.

References

Sources
 

1905 births
1986 deaths
Illinois state court judges
Judges of the Illinois Appellate Court
Judges of the United States District Court for the Northern District of Illinois
United States district court judges appointed by Dwight D. Eisenhower
20th-century American judges
DePaul University College of Law alumni
20th-century American lawyers
Judges of the Superior Court of Cook County